Electromagnetics is a peer-reviewed scientific journal that is published by Taylor & Francis. It covers all aspects of electromagnetics and electromagnetic materials. The editor-in-chief is H. Y. David Yang (University of Illinois at Chicago).

Abstracting and indexing
According to the Journal Citation Reports, the journal has a 2020 impact factor of 1.099. This journal is abstracted and indexed by:
 Science Citation Index
 Current Contents/Engineering, Computing & Technology
 CSA Electronics & Communications Abstracts 
 Engineering Information 
 CSA Solid State & Superconductivity

References

External links 
 

Electrical and electronic engineering journals
Electromagnetism journals
Taylor & Francis academic journals
Publications established in 1981
English-language journals
8 times per year journals